The "Gdańsk Derby" is the name given to describe football matches between teams in Gdańsk, Poland. While this term can be used for any team in Gdańsk historically this term has been used for games involving Gedania Gdańsk, Lechia Gdańsk and Stoczniowiec Gdańsk, historically the three biggest teams in the city of Gdańsk. Lechia Gdańsk are both the most successful team in Gdańsk as well as the most successful team in the derby. Through most of the derbies history the derby has been played in the second and third divisions, with more recent Gdańsk Derbies being played in the regional divisions. There has never been a Gdańsk Derby in the top division as Lechia Gdańsk are currently the only team from Gdańsk to have ever played in the Ekstraklasa.

The first post-war football match in Gdańsk was played by Milicyjny KS Pogoń, playing against Soviet soldiers who were stationed in Gdańsk at the time. The first recorded competitive post-war derby was between Lechia Gdańsk and WKS 16 Dywizji on 9 September 1945 with Lechia winning the game 9-1. It is also the same two teams who hold the record for the biggest win in the derby, with Lechia winning away at WKS 16 Dywizji 13–0 on 30 September 1945. The record for the highest scoring game was contested between Lechia Gdańsk and Płomień Gdańsk on 9 December 1945, with the game finishing as an 11–4 win to Lechia. Lechia also holds the record for documented fixtures, having played in at least 69 Gdańsk Derbies also holding the record for the most wins with 41. Stoczniowiec Gdańsk hold the record for having the documented most draws, while Gedania hold the record for the most documented defeats in the derby.

At least 14 teams have played in the Gdańsk Derby, with the derby having been played more than 100 times since 1945. The majority of the teams who featured in the derby in the 1940s only experienced short spells of playing in the league, most likely due to their sports clubs closing down or merging with other clubs. Gedania Gdańsk, Lechia Gdańsk and Stoczniowiec Gdańsk are seen as the big three teams in the derby due to all three teams being created in 1945 and being among the few teams to not be dissolved which resulted in the teams playing each other often over the following decades. The only other two teams who are now able to play in the Gdańsk Derby are Jaguar Gdańsk and Portowiec Gdańsk, both teams being formed after the other three and having had much lower levels of success in the leagues.

Lechia are considered the biggest team in Gdańsk by some margin. This is due to them being the only team from Gdańsk to play in the Ekstraklasa and having won the Polish Cup twice, most recently in 2019. Stoczniowiec would be seen as Gdańsk's second biggest team due to the number of years they spent in the second and third divisions. In recent years however they have struggled in the lower divisions and fund themselves as one of the lowest ranked teams in Gdańsk. Gedania have also struggled in recent years and have only seen success outside of the regional leagues during the 1945-51 period of their history. Portowiec has often only played in the regional leagues other than short spells in the third division during the 1970s and 1980s. The youngest team of those listed, Jaguar Gdańsk, has slowly been rising up the leagues and has been involved in many Gdańsk Derby's in recent years.

The historic big three

The "big three" or the "main three" teams in the Gdańsk Derby are Gedania Gdańsk, Lechia Gdańsk and Stoczniowiec Gdańsk. All three teams were founded in 1945 after the end of World War II, along with many other sports and football clubs in Gdańsk. While the other teams were eventually closed down, these three teams have kept functioning to the present day. Each team has had their period of success, and times when they could be seen as the biggest team in Gdańsk; Gedania during the early 1950s, Lechia during the 1940s, 1950s, 1980s, and since the turn of the century, and Stoczniowiec in the 1960s and 1970s.

Gedania vs Lechia

Both teams faced each other often in their early years, with the teams playing 9 times in the league in the first six years of their creations. After 1951, when Lechia were promoted to the top division, the teams did not face each other again until the 2003-04 season. This was due to Lechia having to restart from the lower tiers and passed Gedania on their way back up through the divisions. Since 2004 the teams have not faced each other competitively, with the regional cup game in 2004 currently being the last Gdańsk derby between the two teams. A Gedania and Lechia game has never resulted in a draw with Lechia winning 9 and Gedania winning 3 of the 12 competitive games they have played in.

Lechia vs Stoczniowiec

Lechia and Stoczniowiec did not play each other until 1967 after Lechia were relegated to the third tier, after which the two teams faced each other in 15 of the next 16 seasons, with the longest spell coming during 10 consecutive seasons of the teams playing in the same division. During this time the Lechia vs Stoczniowiec rivalry was at its highest. In contrast to Lechia and Gedania never drawing, Lechia and Stoczniowiec drew a third of their games against each other. Lechia and Stoczniowiec have not played each other competitively since 1983, a period of time when Lechia saw success winning back to back promotions, getting back to the Ekstraklasa, and winning the Polish Cup while in the third tier, and the Polish SuperCup while also playing in European competitions the following season in the second tier.

Despite the two teams not playing since 1983 their paths did cross again in 1998 when the two teams merged creating Lechia-Polonia Gdańsk. Due to this merger Stoczniowiec dropped down to the fifth tier for the following season, with Lechia having to restart in the sixth tier in 2001 after it was evident that the merger team was dropping down the leagues after successive relegation's. While Lechia are now back in the top division Stoczniowiec have never recovered from their pre-merger times when they were competitive in the second and third tiers.

Gedania vs Stoczniowiec

After their first meeting in 1952 the two teams started to go in different directions. With Gedania being one of the biggest teams in Gdańsk during the years after their formation, the team started to slip down into the lower divisions, in contrast Stoczniowiec often found themselves moving between the second and third divisions. It wasn't until Stoczniowiec had to restart in the lower divisions did the two teams meet regularly. From 2001-2011 the teams met 14 times in the league Gedania often edging out the games winning five to Stoczniowiec two. The two teams have not met competitively since 2011.

Big three clubs head-to-head

All-time results (the historic big three)

Gedania vs Lechia 

Games: 12, Gedania wins: 3, Lechia wins: 9, Draws: 0 Gedania goals: 21, Lechia goals: 43

Lechia vs Stoczniowiec

Games: 31, Lechia wins: 12, Stoczniowiec wins: 7, Draws: 12 Lechia goals: 32, Stoczniowiec goals: 19

Gedania vs Stoczniowiec

Games: 20, Gedania wins: 6, Stoczniowiec wins: 5, Draws: 9Gedania goals: 27, Stoczniowiec goals: 24

All time results (other teams)
This is a list of games involving the smaller teams of Gdańsk. There is a high possibility that these lists are incomplete, mainly due to the poor record keeping of games in the 1940s and 1950s in the lower leagues at the time, and the difficulty of retrieving information online. All games involving Lechia Gdańsk are known due to the clubs recording keeping throughout the years and the ease of accessibility of these results.

The clubs are listed in date order of the first fixture between the two teams.

Lechia vs WKS 16 Dywizji

Games:3, Lechia wins: 3, WKS 16 Dywizji wins: 0, Draws: 0 Lechia goals: 27, WKS 16 Dywizji goals: 4

Lechia vs Milicyjny

Games:4, Lechia wins: 3, Milicyjny wins: 1, Draws: 0 Lechia goals: 14, Milicyjny goals: 11

Lechia vs Flota Nowy Port

Games:4, Lechia wins: 2, Flota Nowy Port wins: 1, Draws: 1 Lechia goals: 9, Flota Nowy Port goals: 4

Lechia vs Płomień

Games:3, Lechia wins: 2, Płomień: 1, Draws: 0 Lechia goals: 26, Płomień goals: 12

Lechia vs Pogoń

Games:2, Lechia wins: 2, Pogoń: 0, Draws: 0 Lechia goals: 6, Pogoń goals: 1

Lechia vs Bałtyk

Games:1, Lechia wins: 1, Bałtyk: 0, Draws: 0 Lechia goals: 12, Bałtyk goals: 0

Lechia vs Pocztowy

Games:1, Lechia wins: 1, Pocztowy: 0, Draws: 0 Lechia goals: 9, Bałtyk goals: 1

Lechia vs Portowiec

Games: 7, Lechia wins: 5, Portowiec wins: 2, Draws: 0 Lechia goals: 7, Portowiec goals: 4

Gedania vs Portowiec

Games: 14, Gedania wins: 4, Portowiec wins: 4, Draws: 6Gedania goals: 21, Portowiec goals: 25

Stoczniowiec vs Portowiec

Games: 8, Stoczniowiec wins: 4, Portowiec wins: 3, Draws: 1Stoczniowiec goals: 17, Portowiec goals: 9

Stoczniowiec vs MOSiR

Games:2, Stoczniowiec wins: 0, MOSiR wins: 1, Draws: 1Stoczniowiec goals: 1, MOSiR goals: 3

Gedania vs MOSiR

Games:6, Gedania wins: 2, MOSiR wins: 2, Draws: 2Gedania goals: 4, MOSiR goals: 4

MOSiR vs Portowiec

Games:2, MOSiR wins: 0, Portowiec wins: 2, Draws: 0Gedania goals: 3, Portowiec goals: 8

Lechia vs Flotylla

Games:1, Lechia wins: 1, Flotylla: 0, Draws: 0 Lechia goals: 2, Flotylla goals: 0

Jaguar vs Portowiec

Games: 2, Jaguar wins: 2, Portowiec wins: 0, Draws: 0Jaguar goals: 4, Portowiec goals: 2

Gedania vs Jaguar

Games: 17, Gedania wins: 7, Jaguar wins: 7, Draws: 3Gedania goals: 26, Jaguar goals: 26

Jaguar vs Stoczniowiec

Games: 2, Jaguar wins: 1, Stoczniowiec wins: 0, Draws: 1Jaguar goals: 3, Stoczniowiec goals: 0

Lechia II vs Rivals

(the Lechia II team have been included due to the team being competitive in regional divisions and the main team likely to not play a derby game in the immediate future)

Games: 18, Lechia II wins: 11, Draws: 5, Defeats: 2Lechia II goals: 51, goals conceded: 22

Comparison of the other teams

The teams with an asterisk* shows the minimum amount. For instance it is known 16 Dywizji played in both the second and third tiers, but after 1946 the team's performance is unknown.

Stats

This is a display of all of the known statistics.

Historic club names

It is important to note that in Polish football it is much more common for a club to change its name than in other countries. Therefore it is important when looking at historic fixtures to remember the clubs previous names as well. Here is a list of the active clubs in Gdańsk and the names they have gone by.

Club kits

Below are the home kits worn by Gedania, Jaguar, Lechia, Portowiec, and Stoczniowiec for the 2021–22 season.

See also 

Sport in Gdańsk
Tricity Derby
Football in Poland
List of derbies in Poland

References

Football rivalries in Poland
Lechia Gdańsk
Sport in Pomeranian Voivodeship